Mound Township is one of twelve townships in Warren County, Indiana, United States. According to the 2010 census, its population was 418 and it contained 183 housing units.

History
Mound Township was one of the original four created when the county was organized in 1827.

Geography
Extinct communities in the township include Baltimore, which thrived on the banks of the Wabash River in the early 19th century, and Romine Corner. The streams of Kitchen Creek and Possum Run run through the township.

Cemeteries
The township contains these three cemeteries: Baltimore, Rodgers and Upper Mound.

Transportation
U.S. Route 136 runs across the south part of the township, connecting Danville, Illinois to the west with Covington to the east.  Indiana State Road 63 runs from north to south in the eastern part of the township; its child route of Indiana State Road 263 joins State Road 63 just north of the intersection with U.S. Route 136.  The  Vermilion Valley Railroad serves the Flex-N-Gate factory near Covington and runs west from the plant through the town of Foster to meet a CSX line in Danville.

Education
Mound Township is part of the Metropolitan School District of Warren County.

Government
Mound Township has a trustee who administers rural fire protection and ambulance service, provides relief to the poor, manages cemetery care, and performs farm assessment, among other duties. The trustee is assisted in these duties by a three-member township board. The trustees and board members are elected to four-year terms.

Mound Township is part of Indiana's 8th congressional district, Indiana House of Representatives District 42, and Indiana State Senate District 38.

References

 
 United States Census Bureau TIGER/Line Shapefiles

Bibliography

External links

Townships in Warren County, Indiana
1827 establishments in Indiana
Populated places established in 1827
Townships in Indiana